The Four Brothers Sound is an album by American jazz composer and arranger Jimmy Giuffre featuring Giuffre's tenor saxophone overdubbed four times to recreate the sound of Woody Herman's "Four Brothers" band  which was released on the Atlantic label in 1959.

Reception

Brandon Burke of Allmusic states: "The effect of this overdubbing process is, while sonically challenging, unlikely to turn off listeners not quite sold on experimental jazz... ''Four Brothers Sound is proof that the term avant-garde needn't always be associated with harsh dissonance. This is a very enjoyable set".

Track listing 
All compositions by Jimmy Giuffre except as indicated
 "Four Brothers" - 3:23
 "Ode to Switzerland" - 4:44
 "Blues in the Barn" - 4:46
 "Space" - 3:31
 "I Gotta Right to Sing the Blues" (Harold Arlen, Ted Koehler) - 3:26
 "Come Rain or Come Shine" (Arlen, Johnny Mercer) - 2:07
 "Memphis in June" (Hoagy Carmichael, Paul Francis Webster) - 3:31
 "Cabin in the Sky" (Vernon Duke, John La Touche) - 2:57
 "Old Folks" (Dedette Lee Hill, Willard Robison) - 2:22 
Recorded at Atlantic Studios, NYC on June 23, 1958 (track 6), June 25, 1958 (track 2) and Lenox, MA on September 1, 1958 (tracks 1, 3-5 & 7-9)

Personnel 
Jimmy Giuffre - tenor saxophone
Jim Hall - guitar (tracks 1, 3-5 & 7-9)
Bob Brookmeyer - piano (tracks 1, 3-5 & 7-9)

References 

Jimmy Giuffre albums
1959 albums
Atlantic Records albums
Albums produced by Nesuhi Ertegun